The following is a summary of Dublin county hurling team's 2008 season.

Walsh Cup and shield

Dublin decided not to play in the Walsh Cup shield and the so the win was handed to Westmeath

NHL
2008 National Hurling League results

Leinster Senior Hurling Championship

All-Ireland qualifiers
All-Ireland Senior Hurling Championship 2008

See also
 2008 Dublin county football team season

References

Season Dublin
Dublin county hurling team seasons